The World Is Yours may refer to:

Film, television and radio
 The World Is Yours (film), a 2018 French film
 The World Is Yours (TV series), 1951
 The World Is Yours (radio show), 1936–1942

Gaming
 Scarface: The World Is Yours, a video game based on the 1983 movie Scarface

Music
 The Wörld Is Yours, by Motörhead, 2010
 The World Is Yours (Ian Brown album), 2007
 The World Is Yours (Rich the Kid album), 2018
 The World Is Yours (Scarface album), 1993
 The World Is Yours (The Union album), 2013
 The World is Yours, a 2017 album by Slim Thug
 The World Is Yours, a 2007 EP by Andy Grammer
 The World Is Yours, a 2017 EP by Jefe
 "The World Is Yours" (Faith No More song), 1998
 "The World Is Yours" (Nas song), 1994
 "The World Is Yours" a song by 3 Colours Red from the 2004 album The Union of Souls
 "The World Is Yours" a song by AKA from the 2018 album Touch My Blood
 "The World Is Yours", a song by Arch Enemy from the 2017 album Will to Power
 "The World is Yours", a song by Caravan from the 1972 album Waterloo Lily

See also
 
 Scarface (1932 film), features the slogan “The World is Yours”
 Scarface (1983 film), features the slogan “The World is Yours”